NRN is a television station in Coffs Harbour, Australia.

NRN may also refer to:

 National Radio Network (disambiguation)
 Nation's Restaurant News, an American trade publication for the foodservice industry
 Nature Reviews Neuroscience, a review journal covering neuroscience
 "No reply necessary", in Internet slang; see End of message
 Non Resident Nepali
 Weeze Airport (IATA: NRN), an airport in Weeze, Germany

See also